Daniel Pearce Jackson Hodges (born 7 March 1969) is a British newspaper columnist. Since March 2016, he has written a weekly column for The Mail on Sunday. Prior to this, he was a columnist for The Daily Telegraph and in 2013 was described by James Forsyth in The Spectator as David Cameron's "new favourite columnist".

Early life
Born in Lewisham, Hodges is the son of the actress and former Labour MP Glenda Jackson and her then husband Roy Hodges. He was educated at Edge Hill College in Ormskirk, Lancashire, where he studied English Literature and Communications between 1987 and 1990. He worked as a parliamentary researcher for his mother between 1992 and 1997, describing it as 'straight-forward nepotism', before working in public relations for the Road Haulage Association, GMB and the Freedom To Fly lobby group. He worked briefly as Head of Communications at the London Development Agency and as Director of News for Transport for London in 2007, which he left after less than a year after mocking a contractor to the press. He subsequently led the campaign to introduce a congestion charge for Greater Manchester, which was overwhelmingly rejected in local referendums.

Journalism
Hodges has worked as a journalist and blogger, writing in a freelance capacity for the New Statesman, The Daily Telegraph and The Mail on Sunday. He worked for the successful No to AV campaign in 2011, but attracted controversy for a provocative anti-AV poster that suggested electoral reform might lead to the deaths of newborn babies.

After an acrimonious split from the New Statesman in 2011, where Hodges had submitted articles on a freelance basis, his former colleague Mehdi Hasan described his new role with The Daily Telegraph as one where he "now performs the role of the right's useful idiot".

In 2017, Hodges won the Political Commentator of the Year Award at The Comment Awards.

Labour Party
He supported Jon Cruddas in the 2007 deputy leadership election as a member of Compass, but has since been critical of the organisation.

He supported David Miliband in his unsuccessful campaign for the 2010 Labour leadership contest. Hodges describes himself as a "tribal neo-Blairite". He was a vocal critic of the former Labour Party leader Ed Miliband.

In May 2012, although he was then a long-standing member of the Labour Party, Hodges voted for the Conservative Boris Johnson in the London Mayoral elections, lauding him as a "unifying figure" over his former boss Ken Livingstone whom he saw as "divisive" and "a disgrace", adding that "London needs someone who can speak for all of London, not just the balkanized segments whose votes he craves". However, he still voted for Labour London Assembly candidates.

Following the House of Commons vote on 29 August 2013 against possible military involvement in the Syrian civil war, and objecting to Ed Miliband's conduct, Hodges left the Labour Party.

Hodges rejoined the Labour Party in July 2015 and supported Yvette Cooper for the Labour leadership, strongly opposing Jeremy Corbyn's candidacy.

Hodges announced his resignation from the Labour Party a second time in a December 2015 op-ed for The Daily Telegraph accusing party members of abuse and intimidation against Labour MPs.

Other views
Hodges has expressed support for the government suppressing whistleblowers spreading "information highly detrimental to the UK national interest".

Other work
Hodges is also a wargame designer. His first game design was Where There Is Discord: War in the South Atlantic which is about the Falklands War.

In November 2015, Hodges' first book, One Minute To Ten, was published by Penguin Books. It focuses on the three party leaders Cameron, Miliband, and Clegg, and the effect the 2015 general election had on their lives.

Personal life
Hodges married Michelle di Leo in 2003, after meeting her at a Labour Party Conference in 1999. In February 1992, he lost the sight of his left eye trying to stop a fight in a bar. He lives in Blackheath with his wife, children and mother.

References

External links
Daily Telegraph
Dan Hodges Telegraph blog
Twitter page

1969 births
Living people
People from Blackheath, London
English bloggers
English male journalists
English columnists
English political journalists
Trade unionists from London
Journalists from London
The Guardian journalists
The Daily Telegraph people
The Times journalists
Spokespersons
Labour Party (UK) officials
British male bloggers